Jojić is a Serbo-Croatian surname. Notable people with the surname include:

Miloš Jojić (born 1992), Serbian professional footballer
Petar Jojić (born 1938), Serbian politician 
Sonja Jocić, fashion designer

Serbian surnames
Slavic-language surnames
Patronymic surnames